The Big Picture is the third album by contemporary Christian music artist Michael W. Smith, released in 1986 on Reunion Records.The title comes from "Pursuit of the Dream," in which it is heard a few times, but also applies to the variety of themes for young people to learn about from the songs. That track instructs on pursuing goals, and other themes include the folly of escapism ("Lamu"), sexual abstinence before marriage ("Old Enough to Know"), and maintaining a positive self image ("You're Alright"). Track 9. "Tearing Down The Wall" opens with a reverse snippet of Amy Grant's "Emmanuel". The Big Picture was ranked at number 21 on CCM Magazine's 100 Greatest Albums in Christian Music.Smith won a GMA Dove Award for Pop/Contemporary Album of the Year at the 18th GMA Dove Awards and was nominated for a Grammy for Best Gospel Performance, Male at the 29th Grammy Awards.

Track listing 
 All songs written by Michael W. Smith and Wayne Kirkpatrick, except where noted.

Personnel 
 Michael W. Smith – lead vocals, backing vocals, keyboards, drum programming 
 Shane Keister – keyboards, Fairlight programming, drum programming 
 Steve Schaffer, with Music Resources – Synclavier programming
 Dann Huff – guitars 
 Eddie Martinez – guitars 
 Nick Moroch – guitars 
 Chris Rodriguez – guitars, backing vocals 
 Tony Levin – bass, stick bass
 Gary Lunn – bass, drum programming 
 Steve Ferrone – drums 
 David Huff – drums, drum programming 
 Frank Doyle – drum programming 
 Mark Kovac – drum programming 
 John Potoker – drum programming
 Bashiri Johnson – percussion 
 Michael Brecker – saxophones 
 Jim Pugh – trombone 
 Randy Brecker – trumpet 
 Chris Harris – backing vocals 
 Wayne Kirkpatrick – backing vocals 

Backing vocals on "Voices"
 Lisa Bevill, Bridgett Evans, Chris Harris, Marty McCall, Philippe Saisse, Leah Taylor and Tammy Taylor

Production 
 Producers – Michael W. Smith and John Potoker
 Executive Producers – Michael Blanton, Dan Harrell and Brown Bannister
 Engineer and Mixing – John Potoker
 Assistant Engineers – JB, Spencer Chrislu, Mike Clute, Ken Criblez, Nick Delre, Jeffrey Dovener, Rob Feaster, Jim Goldberger, Ed Goodreau, Tim Hattfield, Bill Heath, Keith Odell, Clarke Schleicher, Bob Vogt and Tony Volante.
 Recorded at The Power Station, Mediasound, Sigma Sound and Soundtrack (New York, NY); Bullet Recording and Emerald Sound (Nashville, TN); The Bennett House and The Castle (Franklin, TN); Blue Jay Recording (Carlisle, MA).
 Mixed at Blue Jay Recording (Carlisle, MA).
 Mastering – Ted Jensen at Sterling Sound  (New York, NY).
 Production Coordinator – Kimberly Smith
 Art Direction and Design – Kent Hunter and Thomas Ryan
 Photography – Beverly Ann Moore
 Grooming – Jody Morlock and Julie Miller Overstreet
 Child on album cover – Christopher Copeland

Chart performance

Accolades
GMA Dove Awards

References 

Michael W. Smith albums
1986 albums
Reunion Records albums